Morecambe Cricket Club is an English cricket club based in the tourist resort of Morecambe, Lancashire. The club plays its home matches at Woodhill Lane in the Northern League. The town was founded in 1889 and Morecambe CC is by far the oldest sporting club in it.

The club runs three teams, the 1st team plays in the Northern Premier Cricket League. The 2nd team play in the Moore & Smalley Palace Shield and the 3rd team competes in the Westmorland League.

The club won the Northern Premier League for the sixth time in 2015.

The club also runs a number of junior teams, varying in age ranges and they all compete against local sides.

External links
 http://www.pitchero.com/clubs/morecambecricketclub/
 https://archive.today/20130131093742/http://morecambe.play-cricket.com/home/home.asp

English club cricket teams
Sport in the City of Lancaster
Morecambe
Cricket in Lancashire